James Ramus (born 14 April 1935) is a British sailor. He competed at the 1960 Summer Olympics and the 1968 Summer Olympics.

References

External links
 

1935 births
Living people
British male sailors (sport)
Olympic sailors of Great Britain
Sailors at the 1960 Summer Olympics – Flying Dutchman
Sailors at the 1968 Summer Olympics – Star
Sportspeople from East Sussex
People from Beckley, East Sussex